Donald Arthur Smith (May 4, 1929 – September 7, 2002) was a professional ice hockey player who played eleven games in the National Hockey League.  He played with the New York Rangers. Don is the brother of Kenny Smith.

References

External links

1929 births
2002 deaths
Canadian ice hockey centres
Ice hockey people from Saskatchewan
New York Rangers players
New York Rovers players
Sportspeople from Regina, Saskatchewan
Canadian expatriate ice hockey players in the United States